Kevin Dicklhuber (born 6 March 1989) is a German footballer who plays for Stuttgarter Kickers.

External links

1989 births
People from Albstadt
Sportspeople from Tübingen (region)
Footballers from Baden-Württemberg
Living people
German footballers
Association football wingers
SC Pfullendorf players
Stuttgarter Kickers players
3. Liga players
Oberliga (football) players